The 11mm French Ordnance is a rimmed black powder cartridge intended for the 11 mm MAS 1873-1874 revolver in service with the French Army. The velocity and power of the first variant, equivalent to the .25 ACP, was weak for its time. The second variant, 1873–90, corresponded in power to the .32 ACP.

References

See also
List of handgun cartridges

Pistol and rifle cartridges
Military cartridges